Craig J. Gordwin (born October 24, 1994), known professionally as Craig Xen, is an American rapper, best known for his collaborations with XXXTentacion and hip hop collective Members Only.

Early life 
Gordwin was born on October 24, 1994, in Houston, Texas. He was raised Catholic and frequented a Catholic school until 6th grade. In an interview with Adam22 in February 2016, he stated that he was raised by his mother while his father spent time in jail and that he started rapping when he was 6 years old with his cousin. He grew up listening to Screwed Up Click, Green Day, Linkin Park, Eminem and Lil B, the last one being one of his biggest musical inspiration. The last name in his stage name, Xen (formerly Zen) came from the time he was in high school when Xen was interested by spirituality, used hallucinogens and practised meditation.

Career 
Craig Xen released his first song, "H.D.A.B.", in April 2013 on SoundCloud featuring his cousin Kay Rillo.  In 2015, before joining Members Only, he was a member of the Schemaposse collective, which included rappers JGRXXN, Lil Peep and Ghostemane, until their dissolution. In February 2016, he released the song "Good Fellas" featuring Pouya and Shakewell.

Xen appeared on 4 songs from the mixtape Members Only, Vol. 3, released on June 26, 2017. The hip hop collective's debut album, Members Only, Vol. 4, was released on January 23, 2019, by Empire. The project debuted at number 18 on the US Billboard 200 and Craig Xen appeared on 8 songs.

During the year 2016, Xen released few songs like "Death to He Who Cross Me", "Six Men, One Casket" and "Blueberry Lemonade" featuring Lil Peep and Nedarb. Craig Xen was featured on XXXTentacion's single "I Wonder If Bloods Watch Blues Clues". Another collaborative single, "Crucify Thy Infant, Son of Whore" with XXXTentacion and Garette Revenge was released in May 2017. His first studio album, Voltage, was released by label Cruel World in October 2017. His second studio album, Hell Bent, was released in May 2018 by Empire with singles like "Killa" featuring Yung Bans or "Murder" featuring Wifisfuneral.

Craig Xen was featured alongside Lil Skies on Gnar's song "Death Note". The music video for the song was directed by Cole Bennett and was published on Lyrical Lemonade YouTube channel on June 4, 2019. Craig Xen's first extended play, Broken Kids Club, was released in June 2019 by Cruel World and Empire. The project is supported by songs "Run it Back!" with XXXTentacion and "Stain" featuring Ski Mask the Slump God and Smokepurpp. A music video for the project's song "Cry Baby, Cell 17", directed by JMP, was published on July 17, 2019 and another music video for the song "Run it Back!", also directed by JMP, was released on July 30, 2019. was released. Craig Xen was featured on the song "The Only Time I Feel Alive" from XXXTentacion's posthumous album Bad Vibes Forever, which was released in December 2019.

Discography

Studio albums 
 Members Only, Vol. 4 (2019) with Members Only
 Why (2020)

Mixtapes 
 Infinite ☥ Militia (2015) with Kay Rillo
 CHAPTER ONE – ENTER REALM (2015) with GG Neeks
 CHAPTER TWO – THE ORACLE (2015) with GG Neeks
 Decay (2015)
 Brute (2015)
 Xen (2015)
 DARKWATER (2015)
 5 ★ THREAT (2015)
 Resilient (2016)
 Waist Deep (2016)
 Revelation (2016)
 Martyr (2016)
 Members Only, Vol. 3 (2017) with Members Only
 Voltage (2017)
 Hell Bent (2018)
 PROTECT ME FROM MYSELF (2019)

Extended plays 
 Broken Kids Club (2019)
  God is Watching (2020)

Singles 
 Bare Flesh (2016)
 Voltage (2016)
 Succubus (2016)
 Chopstix (2018)
 Stain (2018)
 Run It Back! (2019) with XXXTentacion

References 

1994 births
Living people
21st-century American male musicians
21st-century American rappers
American hip hop musicians
Hardcore hip hop artists
Lo-fi musicians
Rappers from Houston
Songwriters from Texas
Trap metal musicians